The Money Store may refer to:

 The Money Store (album), the debut studio album by the group Death Grips
 The Money Store (company), a U.S. residential mortgage company